The Zona de Ejecucion (July 2018) (Spanish for "Elimination Zone") was a major lucha libre event produced and scripted by Mexican Lucha Libre, or professional wrestling promotion, International Wrestling Revolution Group (IWRG). The show was held on January 7, 2018 in Arena Naucalpan, Naucalpan, State of Mexico, Mexico, IWRG's main arena. The show was the second time IWRG held the eponymous Zona de Ejecucion match, after having held the first Zona de Ejecucion in January 2018.

For the main event Zona de Ejecucion match four teams of four faced off in an elimination match. Each team was represented in the ring by a select team member, once he was eliminated another person from that team could enter the ring until only one person or team was left. The team of El Hijo del Medico Asesino, Eterno, Trauma I, Trauma II defeated the teams of Leo, Mike, Rafy, Relámpago / Dr. Cerebro, El Hijo de Canis Lupus, Pantera, Veneno / Emperador Azteca, Freelance, El Hijo del Alebrije, Imposible. The match was won when Trauma II eliminating Dr. Cerebro to become the only survivor. The show featured five additional matches.

Storylines
The event featured five professional wrestling matches with different wrestlers involved in pre-existing scripted feuds, plots and storylines. Wrestlers were portrayed as either heels (referred to as rudos in Mexico, those that portray the "bad guys") or faces (técnicos in Mexico, the "good guy" characters) as they followed a series of tension-building events, which culminated in a wrestling match or series of matches.

Results

References

External links 
 

2018 in professional wrestling
2018 in Mexico
IWRG Zona de Ejecucion
July 2018 events in Mexico